Chionellidea is a moth genus in the family Autostichidae. It contains the species Chionellidea leucella, which is found in Palestine.

References

Symmocinae